This article contains information about the literary events and publications of 1736.

Events
Charles Rivington founds a company of London booksellers known as the New Conger.

New books

Prose
Anonymous – The Life of Marianne (fiction, translation of Pierre Carlet de Chamblain de Marivaux)
Joseph Addison – The Works of Petronius Arbiter (translation)
John Armstrong – The Oeconomy of Love
Thomas Bayes – An Introduction to the Doctrine of Fluxions, and a Defence of the Mathematicians Against the Objections of the Author of the Analyst
Isaac Hawkins Browne – A Pipe of Tobacco
Joseph Butler – Analogy of Religion
Thomas Carte – Life of James Duke of Ormonde
William Rufus Chetwood – The Voyages. . . of William Owen Gwin Vaughan
Claude Prosper Jolyot de Crébillon – Les Égarements du cœur et de l'esprit (Strayings of the Heart and Mind), part one
John Gyles – Memoirs of Odd Adventures, Strange Deliverances, &c. in the Captivity of John Gyles, Esq
Eliza Haywood – Adventures of Eovaai (later as The Unfortunate Princess)
Muhammad ibn Abd-al-Wahhab – Kitab at-tawhidt
Isaac Newton – Method of Fluxions
Elizabeth Singer Rowe – The History of Joseph
William Stukeley – Palaeographia Sacra
James Thomson – Britain
William Warburton – The Alliance Between Church and State (an answer to Benjamin Hoadly from the year before)
Leonard Welsted – The Scheme and Conduct of Providence
Diego de Torres Villarroel
Los desahuciados del mundo y de la gloria (The Deathly Illness of the World and of Glory)
Historia de historias

Drama
Henry Carey – The Honest Yorkshireman
Colley Cibber – Papal Tyranny in the Reign of King John
 Mr. Connolly – The Connoisseur
 Elizabeth Cooper – The Nobleman
Henry Fielding – Pasquin
Aaron Hill – 
 Alzira
 Zara
 Samuel Johnson – All Alive and Merry
James Sterling – The Parricide

Poems

Stephen Duck – Poems on Several Occasions
William Melmoth – Two Epistles of Horace Imitated
Alexander Pope – The Works of Alexander Pope vols iii–iv
Voltaire – Le Mondain

Births
May 10 – George Steevens, English Shakespearean editor and hoaxer (died 1800)
June 25 – John Horne Tooke, English controversialist and cleric (died 1812)
October 27 – James Macpherson, Scottish writer, poet and politician (died 1796)
Unknown dates
Robert Jephson, Irish dramatist and politician (died 1803)
James Ridley (Sir Charles Morell), English novelist and story writer (died 1765)

Deaths
January 8 – Jean Le Clerc, Swiss theologian (born 1657)
February 9 – Barnaby Bernard Lintot, English bookseller and publisher (born 1675)
March 18 – Jacob Tonson, English bookseller and publisher (born c. 1655)
April 30 – Johann Albert Fabricius, German scholar and bibliographer (born 1668)
July 16 – Thomas Yalden, English poet and translator (born 1670)

References

 
Years of the 18th century in literature